is a former Japanese football player and manager. Currently, he is head coach of Japan women's national under-17 football team and he is current manager WE League club of Urawa Red Diamonds.

Playing career
Naoki Kusunose played for Yomiuri and Honda as defender.

Coaching career
Naoki Kusunose became manager for some youth team; e.g. Hakuoh University, Tokyo Verdy youth team. Since 2012, he became stuff for FC Machida Zelvia. In November, manager; Osvaldo Ardiles was sacked. Naoki Kusunose managed team as caretaker. After that, Yutaka Akita was appointed new manager. But In June 2013 manager; Yutaka Akita was sacked. So, Naoki Kusunose managed team as caretaker again until end of 2013 season. In February 2015, Naoki Kusunose became head coach for Japan women's U-17 national team (aiming for 2016 FIFA U-17 Women's World Cup in Jordan). In November, Japan won second position in 2015 AFC U-16 Women's Championship and qualified for 2016 FIFA U-17 Women's World Cup. He resigned before 2018 FIFA U-17 Women's World Cup in November.

References

External links

1964 births
Living people
Hosei University alumni
Association football people from Tokyo
Japanese footballers
Japan Soccer League players
Japan Football League (1992–1998) players
Tokyo Verdy players
Honda FC players
Japanese football managers
FC Machida Zelvia managers
Association football defenders